Eino Penttilä (27 August 1906 – 24 November 1982) was a Finnish javelin thrower who won a bronze medal at the 1932 Summer Olympics, behind teammates Matti Järvinen and Matti Sippala.

Career

Penttlä was a Biathlon competitor who changed to javelin throw at the age of 15. He won the national title in 1926–1928, and set a new world record in October 1927. He was a favorite at the 1928 Olympics, but finished sixth due to an elbow injury. After that he lost domestic competitions to Matti Järvinen, and at the 1932 Games finished third. He retired in 1936 due to the old injury.

References

1906 births
1982 deaths
Finnish male javelin throwers
People from Lappeenranta
People from Viipuri Province (Grand Duchy of Finland)
Olympic bronze medalists for Finland
Athletes (track and field) at the 1928 Summer Olympics
Athletes (track and field) at the 1932 Summer Olympics
Olympic athletes of Finland
Medalists at the 1932 Summer Olympics
Olympic bronze medalists in athletics (track and field)
Sportspeople from South Karelia
20th-century Finnish people